The 2021–22 season was the 97th season in the existence of Chamois Niortais F.C. and the club's eighth consecutive season in the second division of French football. The team was excluded from Coupe de France this season.

Players

First-team squad

Transfers

Pre-season and friendlies

Competitions

Overall record

Ligue 2

League table

Results summary

Results by round

Matches
The league fixtures were announced on 25 June 2021.

References

Chamois Niortais F.C. seasons
Niort